Kai Tier is a Melbourne-based standup comic/actor. After starting comedy in Brisbane in 2001, Kai moved to Perth and became the WA winner of Triple J's RAW Comedy in 2002. After graduating from WAAPA's Acting course in 2004 and moved to Melbourne at the end of that year. In 2005, his standup show Klamidia - The Musical premiered at the Melbourne comedy festival, which was followed by his 2006 show Kai Tier is Childhead, and his 2007 Melbourne Fringe Festival Show The Candidate.

References

External links
Kai Tier on Myspace

Living people
Australian male comedians
Year of birth missing (living people)